Benoni is a town in Ekurhuleni municipality, Gauteng, South Africa.

Benoni was also the setting for the MTV-inspired movie Crazy Monkey: Straight Outta Benoni, released internationally in 2005.

People from Benoni
Urzila Carlson, New Zealand based comedian, from Benoni
R. Graham Cooks, chemist
Charlene, Princess of Monaco, (née Charlene Wittstock), swimmer, and consort of Prince Albert II of Monaco
Bryan Habana, former Springboks rugby player
Philip Holiday, IBF World Champion Boxer
Morris Kahn (born 1930), Israeli billionaire, founder and chairman of Aurec Group
Mildred Mangxola, singer and member of the Mahotella Queens
 Frith van der Merwe, schoolteacher at Benoni High and the most prolific female runner in the history of the Comrades Marathon
Pops Mohamed, jazz musician
Genevieve Morton, top model 
Grace Mugabe, former First Lady of Zimbabwe
 Bradley Player, cricketer
 Oliver Reginald Tambo, anti-apartheid politician
Charlize Theron, Oscar-winning actress (Academy Awards: Best Actress Monster)
Vic Toweel, former undisputed World bantamweight champion and South African boxing champion.
Jill Trappler, visual artist
Nibs van der Spuy, guitarist, singer, songwriter

Arms

References

External links
 AllRefer Encyclopedia – Benoni, South Africa

East Rand
Populated places in Ekurhuleni
Populated places established in 1881